The 2015 Houston Astros season was the 54th season for the Major League Baseball (MLB) franchise in Houston, Texas, their 51st as the Astros, third in both the American League (AL) and AL West division, and 16th season at Minute Maid Park. 

The Astros made the playoffs for the first time since 2005, and the first since moving to the American League. They defeated the New York Yankees in the Wild Card Game before taking the eventual World Series champion Kansas City Royals to five games in the Division Series, nearly pulling off a major upset.

Offseason

 11/5/14 – Astros trade C Carlos Perez and RHP Nick Tropeano to the L.A. Angels for C Hank Conger.
 12/12/14 – Astros sign free agent RHPs Luke Gregerson and Pat Neshek.
 12/15/14 – Astros sign free agent SS Jed Lowrie.
 1/14/15 – Astros trade RHP Mike Foltynewicz, 3B Rio Ruiz and RHP Andrew Thurman to the Atlanta Braves for C/OF Evan Gattis and RHP James Hoyt.
 1/19/15 – Astros trade CF Dexter Fowler to the Chicago Cubs for 3B Luis Valbuena and RHP Dan Straily.
 1/20/15 – Astros sign free agent OF Colby Rasmus.

Spring training
After a five-year gap in contact with the Astros organization, former first baseman Jeff Bagwell accepted a formal invitation from manager A. J. Hinch to be a guest instructor in spring training.

Regular season

Season standings

American League West

American League Wild Card

Record against opponents

Game log

Regular season

|- bgcolor="#bbbfffbbb;"
| 1 || April 6 || Indians || 2–0 || Keuchel (1–0) || Kluber (0–1) || Gregerson (1) || 43,753 || 1–0
|- bgcolor="#fffbbbbbb;"
| 2 || April 8 || Indians || 0–2 || Carrasco (1–0) || Feldman (0–1) || Allen (1) || 23,078 || 1–1
|- bgcolor="#fffbbbbbb;"
| 3 || April 9 || Indians || 1–5 || Bauer (1–0) || Wojciechowski (0–1) || — || 22,593 || 1–2
|- bgcolor="#bbbfffbbb;"
| 4 || April 10 || @ Rangers || 5–1 || McHugh (1–0) || Holland (0–1) || — || 48,885 || 2–2
|- bgcolor="#fffbbbbbb;"
| 5 || April 11 || @ Rangers || 2–6 || Gallardo (1–1) || Hernández (0–1) || — || 36,833 || 2–3
|- bgcolor="#bbbfffbbb;"
| 6 || April 12 || @ Rangers || 6–4 (14) || Harris (1–0) || Verrett (0–1) || Deduno (1) || 35,276 || 3–3
|- bgcolor="#fffbbbbbb;"
| 7 || April 13 || Athletics || 1–8 || Kazmir (2–0) || Feldman (0–2) || — || 19,279 || 3–4
|- bgcolor="#fffbbbbbb;"
| 8 || April 14 || Athletics || 0–4 || Graveman (1–1) || Peacock (0–1) || — || 18,935 || 3–5
|- bgcolor="#bbbfffbbb;"
| 9 || April 15 || Athletics || 6–1 || McHugh (2–0) || Pomeranz (1–1) || — || 19,777 || 4–5
|- bgcolor="#fffbbbbbb;"
| 10 || April 17 || Angels || 3–6 || Ramos (1–0) || Qualls (0–1) || Street (4) || 22,660 || 4–6
|- bgcolor="#bbbfffbbb;"
| 11 || April 18 || Angels || 4–0 || Keuchel (2–0) || Wilson (1–2) || — || 28,209 || 5–6
|- bgcolor="#bbbfffbbb;"
| 12 || April 19 || Angels || 4–3 || Feldman (1–2) || Richards (0–1) || Gregerson (2) || 24,254 || 6–6
|- bgcolor="#bbbfffbbb;"
| 13 || April 20 || @ Mariners || 7–5 || Sipp (1–0) || Farquhar (0–1) || Gregerson (3) || 15,129 || 7–6
|- bgcolor="#bbbfffbbb;"
| 14 || April 21 || @ Mariners || 6–3 || McHugh (3–0) || Furbush (0–1) || Qualls (1) || 13,949 || 8–6
|- bgcolor="#fffbbbbbb;"
| 15 || April 22 || @ Mariners || 2–3 || Happ (1–1) || Hernández (0–2) || Rodney (4) || 14,756 || 8–7
|- bgcolor="#bbbfffbbb;"
| 16 || April 24 || @ Athletics || 5–4 (11) || Gregerson (1–0) || O'Flaherty (0–2) || Qualls (2) ||  18,205 || 9–7
|- bgcolor="#bbbfffbbb;"
| 17 || April 25 || @ Athletics || 9–3 || Feldman (2–2) || Graveman (1–2) || — || 24,342 || 10–7
|- bgcolor="#bbbfffbbb;"
| 18 || April 26 || @ Athletics || 7–6 || Sipp (2–0) || Clippard (0–2) || Gregerson (4) || 22,080 || 11–7
|- bgcolor="#bbbfffbbb;"
| 19 || April 27 || @ Padres || 9–4 || Neshek (1–0) || Benoit (3–1) || — || 19,532 || 12–7
|- bgcolor="#bbbfffbbb;"
| 20 || April 28 || @ Padres || 14–3 || Hernández (1–2) || Ross (1–2) || — || 22,796 || 13–7
|- bgcolor="#bbbfffbbb;"
| 21 || April 29 || @ Padres || 7–2 || Keuchel (3–0) || Cashner (1–4) || — || 21,824 || 14–7
|- bgcolor="#bbbfffbbb;"
| 22 || April 30 || Mariners || 3–2 (10) || Gregerson (2–0) || Leone (0–2) || — || 19,108 || 15–7
|-

|- bgcolor="#bbbfffbbb;"
| 23 || May 1 || Mariners || 4–3 || Fields (1–0) || Elias (0–1) || Gregerson (5) || 21,834 || 16–7
|- bgcolor="#bbbfffbbb;"
| 24 || May 2 || Mariners || 11–4 || McHugh (4–0) || Walker (1–3) || — || 24,435 || 17–7
|- bgcolor="#bbbfffbbb;"
| 25 || May 3 || Mariners || 7–6 || Neshek (2–0) || Smith (0–1) || Gregerson (6) || 25,283 || 18–7
|- bgcolor="#fffbbbbbb"
| 26 || May 4 || Rangers || 1–2 || Kela (2–1)|| Qualls (0–2) || Feliz (3) || 17,597 || 18–8
|- bgcolor="#fffbbbbbb"
| 27 || May 5 || Rangers || 1–7 || Rodríguez (1–1) || Feldman (2–3) || — || 20,951 || 18–9
|- bgcolor="#fffbbbbbb"
| 28 || May 6 || Rangers || 3–11 || Lewis (2–2) || Deduno (0–1) || — || 22,230 || 18–10
|- bgcolor="#bbbfffbbb;"
| 29 || May 7 || @ Angels || 3–2 || Neshek (3–0) || Street (2–1) || Gregerson (7) || 25,097 || 19–10
|- bgcolor="#fffbbbbbb;"
| 30 || May 8 || @ Angels || 0–2 || Weaver (1–4) || Hernández (1–3) || — || 40,006 || 19–11
|- bgcolor="#bbbfffbbb;"
| 31 || May 9 || @ Angels || 6–5 || Keuchel (4–0) || Shoemaker (2–3) || Qualls (3) || 40,210 || 20–11
|- bgcolor="#fffbbbbbb;"
| 32 || May 10 || @ Angels || 1–3 || Richards (3–1) || Feldman (2–4) || Street (10) || 30,929 || 20–12
|- bgcolor="#fffbbbbbb;"
| 33 || May 12 || Giants || 1–8 || Heston (3–3) || McHugh (4–1) || — || 20,468 || 20–13
|- bgcolor="#bbbfffbbb;"
| 34 || May 13 || Giants || 4–3 || Qualls (1–2) || Affeldt (0–2) || Gregerson (8) || 20,725 || 21–13
|- bgcolor="#bbbfffbbb;"
| 35 || May 14 || Blue Jays || 6–4 || Fields (2–0) || Loup (1–2) || Qualls (4) || 15,777 || 22–13
|- bgcolor="#bbbfffbbb;"
| 36 || May 15 || Blue Jays || 8–4 || Keuchel (5–0) || Dickey (1–5) || — || 21,653 || 23–13
|- bgcolor="#bbbfffbbb;"
| 37 || May 16 || Blue Jays || 6–5 || Feldman (3–4) || Francis (1–2) || Gregerson (9) || 27,102 || 24–13
|- bgcolor="#bbbfffbbb;"
| 38 || May 17 || Blue Jays || 4–2 || McHugh (5–1) || Buehrle (5–3) || Gregerson (10) || 25,307 || 25–13
|- bgcolor="#fffbbbbbb;"
| 39 || May 18 || Athletics || 1–2 || Mujica (2–1) || Thatcher (0–1) || Clippard (4) || 21,724 || 25–14
|- bgcolor="#bbbfffbbb;"
| 40 || May 19 || Athletics || 6–4 || Hernández (2–3) || Gray (4–2) || Neshek (1) || 17,575 || 26–14
|- bgcolor="#bbbfffbbb;"
| 41 || May 20 || Athletics || 6–1 || Keuchel (6–0) || Hahn (1–4) || — || 21,066 || 27–14
|- bgcolor="#fffbbbbbb;"
| 42 || May 21 || @ Tigers || 5–6 (11) || Wilson (1–0)  || Sipp (2–1)  || — || 33,193 || 27–15
|- bgcolor="#fffbbbbbb;"
| 43 || May 22 || @ Tigers || 2–6 || Simón (5–2) || McHugh (5–2) || — || 37,276 || 27–16
|- bgcolor="#bbbfffbbb;"
| 44 || May 23 || @ Tigers || 3–2 || McCullers (1–0) || Lobstein (3–5) || Gregerson (11) || 40,153 || 28–16
|- bgcolor="#bbbfffbbb;"
| 45 || May 24 || @ Tigers || 10–8 || Thatcher (1–1) || Wilson (1–1) || Gregerson (12) || 36,449 || 29–16
|- bgcolor="#fffbbbbbb;"
| 46 || May 25 || @ Orioles || 3–4 || Brach (2–0) || Keuchel (6–1) || Britton (11) || 28,909 || 29–17
|- bgcolor="#bbbfffbbb;"
| 47 || May 26 || @ Orioles || 4–1 || Feldman (4–4) || Tillman (2–6) || Gregerson (13) || 21,541 || 30–17
|- bgcolor="#fffbbbbbb;"
| 48 || May 27 || @ Orioles || 4–5 || Brach (3–0) || Sipp (2–2) || Britton (12) || 16,401 || 30–18
|- bgcolor="#fffbbbbbb;"
| 49 || May 29 || White Sox || 3–6 (11) || Jennings (1–1) || Fields (2–1) || Robertson (10) || 25,957 || 30–19
|- bgcolor="#bbbfffbbb;"
| 50 || May 30 || White Sox || 3–0 || Keuchel (7–1) || Quintana (2–6) || — || 29,720 || 31–19
|- bgcolor="#fffbbbbbb;"
| 51 || May 31 || White Sox || 0–6 || Danks (3–4) || Hernández (2–4) || — || 27,423 || 31–20
|-

|- bgcolor="#bbbfffbbb;"
| 52 || June 1 || Orioles || 5–2 || Harris (2–0) || Brach (3–1) || Gregerson (14) || 17,259 || 32–20
|- bgcolor="#bbbfffbbb;"
| 53 || June 2 || Orioles || 6–4 || McHugh (6–2) || Wright (2–1) || Gregerson (15) || 18,730 || 33–20
|- bgcolor="#bbbfffbbb;"
| 54 || June 3 || Orioles || 3–1 || McCullers (2–0) || González (5–4) || — || 20,305 || 34–20
|- bgcolor="#fffbbbbbb;"
| 55 || June 4 || Orioles || 2–3 || O'Day (2–0) || Qualls (1–3) || Britton (14) || 20,219 || 34–21
|- bgcolor="#fffbbbbbb;"
| 56 || June 5 || @ Blue Jays || 2–6 || Sanchez (5–4) || Hernández (2–5) || — || 22,971 || 34–22
|- bgcolor="#fffbbbbbb;"
| 57 || June 6 || @ Blue Jays || 2–7 ||  Hutchison (5–1) || Oberholtzer (0–1) || — || 31,809 || 34–23
|- bgcolor="#fffbbbbbb;"
| 58 || June 7 || @ Blue Jays || 6–7 || Hendriks (1–0) || Gregerson (2–1) || — || 35,571 || 34–24
|- bgcolor="#fffbbbbbb;"
| 59 || June 8 || @ White Sox || 1–3 || Sale (6–2) ||  McCullers (2–1)|| Robertson (11) || 17,352 || 34–25
|- bgcolor="#fffbbbbbb;"
| 60 || June 9 || @ White Sox || 2–4 || Rodon (2–0) || Keuchel (7–2) || Robertson (12) || 18,439 || 34–26
|- bgcolor="#fffbbbbbb;"
| 61 || June 10 || @ White Sox || 1–4 || Quintana (3–6) || Sipp (2–3) || Robertson (13) || 17,455 || 34–27
|- bgcolor="#bbbfffbbb;"
| 62 || June 12 || Mariners || 10–0 || Oberholtzer (1–1) || Hernández (9-3) || — || 32,173 || 35–27
|- bgcolor="#fffbbbbbb;"
| 63 || June 13 || Mariners || 1–8 || Montgomery (1–1) || McHugh (6–3) || — || 36,762 || 35–28
|- bgcolor="#bbbfffbbb;"
| 64 || June 14 || Mariners || 13–0 || McCullers (3–1) || Elias (3–4) || — || 29,153 || 36–28
|- bgcolor="#bbbfffbbb;"
| 65 || June 15 || Rockies || 6–3 || Keuchel (8–2) || Bettis (2–2) || Gregerson (16) || 21,820 || 37–28
|- bgcolor="#bbbfffbbb;"
| 66 || June 16 || Rockies || 8–5 || Harris (3–0) || Rusin (2–2) || Gregerson (17) || 22,245 || 38–28
|- bgcolor="#bbbfffbbb;"
| 67 || June 17 || @ Rockies || 8–4 || Oberholtzer (2–1) || Kendrick (2–9) || — || 33,041 || 39–28
|- bgcolor="#bbbfffbbb;"
| 68 || June 18 || @ Rockies || 8–4 || McHugh (7–3) || Hale (2–2) || — || 30,770 || 40–28
|- bgcolor="#fffbbbbbb;"
| 69 || June 19 || @ Mariners || 2–5 || Elias (4–4) || McCullers (3–2) || Smith (4) || 40,914 || 40–29
|- bgcolor="#fffbbbbbb;"
| 70 || June 20 || @ Mariners || 3–6 || Walker (5–6) || Keuchel (8–3) || Smith (5) || 26,770 || 40–30
|- bgcolor="#bbbfffbbb;"
| 71 || June 21 || @ Mariners || 6–2 || Harris (4–0) || Happ (3–4) || — || 40,905 || 41–30
|- bgcolor="#fffbbbbbb;"
| 72 || June 22 || @ Angels || 3–4 || Street (3–2)  || Qualls (1–4) || — || 34,153 || 41–31
|- bgcolor="#bbbfffbbb;"
| 73 || June 23 || @ Angels || 13–3 || McHugh (8–3) || Wilson (5–6) || — || 41,208 || 42–31
|- bgcolor="#fffbbbbbb;"
| 74 || June 24 || @ Angels || 1–2 (13) || Alvarez  (2–1)  || Thatcher (1–2) || — || 33,543 || 42–32
|- bgcolor="#bbbfffbbb;"
| 75 || June 25 || Yankees || 4–0 || Keuchel (9–3) || Warren (5–5)  || — || 28,643 || 43–32
|- bgcolor="#fffbbbbbb;"
| 76 || June 26 || Yankees || 2–3 || Eovaldi (7–2) || Harris (4–1) || Betances (5) || 37,748 || 43–33
|- bgcolor="#fffbbbbbb;"
| 77 || June 27 || Yankees || 6–9 || Shreve (5–1) || Neshek (3–1) || Betances (6) || 41,133 || 43–34
|- bgcolor="#bbbfffbbb;"
| 78 || June 28 || Yankees || 3–1 || McHugh (9–3) ||Pineda (8–5) || Gregerson (18) || 31,961 || 44–34
|- bgcolor="#bbbfffbbb;"
| 79 || June 29 || Royals || 6–1 || McCullers (4–2) || Blanton (2–1)  || — || 20,419 || 45–34
|- bgcolor="#bbbfffbbb;"
| 80 || June 30 || Royals || 4–0 || Keuchel (10–3) || Duffy (2–4)  || — || 24,642 || 46–34
|-

|- bgcolor="#bbbfffbbb;"
| 81 || July 1 || Royals || 6–5 || Gregerson (3–1) || Herrera (1–2) || — || 25,848 || 47–34
|- bgcolor="#bbbfffbbb;"
| 82 || July 3 || @ Red Sox || 12–8 (10) || Hernández (3–5) || Ramirez (0–1) || — || 37,837 || 48–34
|- bgcolor="#fffbbbbbb;"
| 83 || July 4 || @ Red Sox || 1–6 || Buchholz (7–6) || McHugh (9–4) || — || 36,703 || 48–35
|- bgcolor="#fffbbbbbb;"
| 84 || July 5 || @ Red Sox || 4–5 || Barnes (3–2) || Sipp (2–4) || Uehara (19) ||  36,481|| 48–36
|- bgcolor="#bbbfffbbb;"
| 85 || July 6 || @ Indians || 9–4 || Keuchel (11–3) || Carrasco (10–7) || — ||  || 49-36
|- bgcolor= "#fffbbbbbb;"
| 86 || July 7 || @ Indians || 0–2 || Kluber (4–9) || Velasquez (0–1)  || Shaw (2) ||10,821|| 49-37
|- bgcolor="#fffbbbbbb;"
| 87 || July 8 || @ Indians || 2–4 || Bauer (8–5) || Thatcher (1–3) || Allen (17) ||15,255|| 49–38
|- bgcolor= "#fffbbbbbb;"
| 88 || July 9 || @ Indians || 1–3 || Anderson (2–1) || Oberholtzer (2–2) || Allen (18) ||11,496|| 49–39
|- bgcolor= "#fffbbbbbb;"
| 89 || July 10 || @ Rays || 1–3 || Ramírez (8–3) || McHugh (9–5) || Boxberger (21) ||17,129|| 49–40
|- bgcolor= "#fffbbbbbb;"
| 90 || July 11 || @ Rays || 0–3 || Odorizzi (5–5) || Keuchel (11–4)  || Boxberger (22) ||18,429|| 49–41
|- bgcolor=  "#fffbbbbbb;"
| 91 || July 12 || @ Rays || 3–4 || Moore (1–0)  || McCullers (4–3)  || Boxberger (23) ||16,458|| 49–42
|- bgcolor= #bbcaff
| – || July 14 || 86th All-Star Game || AL 6–3 NL || Price (1–0) || Kershaw (0–1) || — ||43,656||49–42
|- bgcolor="#bbbfffbbb;"
| 92 || July 17 || Rangers || 3–2 ||McHugh (10–5) || Pérez (0–1) || Gregerson (19) ||36,904|| 50–42
|- bgcolor= "#fffbbbbbb;"
| 93 || July 18 || Rangers || 6–7 || Lewis (9–4) || Feldman (4–5) || Tolleson (14) ||41,941|| 50–43
|- bgcolor= "#bbbfffbbb;"
| 94 || July 19 || Rangers || 10–0 || Keuchel (12–4) || Gallardo (7–9) || — ||36,532|| 51–43
|- bgcolor= "#bbbfffbbb;"
| 95 || July 21 || Red Sox ||8–3 || Velasquez (1–1)  || Johnson (0–1) || — ||26,913|| 52–43
|- bgcolor= "#bbbfffbbb;"
| 96 || July 22 || Red Sox ||4 –2 ||McHugh (11–5) || Kelly (2–6) || Gregerson (20) ||31,104|| 53–43
|- bgcolor= "#bbbfffbbb;"
| 97 || July 23 || Red Sox || 5–4|| Fields (3–1) || Breslow (0–1)  || — ||30,748|| 54–43
|- bgcolor= "#bbbfffbbb;"
| 98 || July 24 || @ Royals || 4–0|| Kazmir (6–5) || Guthrie (7–6) || Gregerson (21) ||36,965|| 55–43
|- bgcolor= "#fffbbbbbb;"
| 99 || July 25 || @ Royals || 1–2 (10) || Herrera (2–2) || Harris (4–2) || — ||38,393|| 55–44
|- bgcolor= "#fffbbbbbb;"
| 100 || July 26 || @ Royals || 1–5 || Ventura (5–7)  || Keuchel (12–5) || — ||33,638|| 55–45
|- bgcolor= "#bbbfffbbb;"
| 101 || July 28 || Angels || 10–5 || McHugh (12–5)  || Wilson (8–8) || — ||24,031|| 56–45
|- bgcolor="#bbbfffbbb;"
| 102 || July 29 || Angels || 6–3 || McCullers (5–3) || Richards (10–8) || — || 31,272 || 57–45
|- bgcolor="#bbbfffbbb;"
| 103 || July 30 || Angels || 3–0 || Gregerson (4–1) || Álvarez (2–2) || — || 27,598 || 58–45
|- bgcolor="#fffbbbbbb;"
| 104 || July 31 || D-backs || 4–6 || Hudson (3–3) || Neshek (3–2) || Ziegler (18) || 34,720 || 58–46
|-

|- bgcolor="#bbbfffbbb;"
| 105 || August 1 || D-backs || 9–2 || Keuchel (13–5) || Hellickson (7–7) || — || 36,602 || 59–46
|- bgcolor="#bbbfffbbb;"
| 106 || August 2 || D-backs || 4–1 || McHugh (13–5) || Ray (3–6) || Gregerson (22) || 33,871 || 60–46
|- bgcolor="#fffbbbbbb;"
| 107 || August 3 || @ Rangers || 9–12 || Lewis (12–4) || McCullers (5–4) || Tolleson (19) || 21,671 || 60–47
|- bgcolor="#fffbbbbbb;"
| 108 || August 4 || @ Rangers || 3–4 || Gallardo (8–9) || Straily (0–1) || Tolleson (20) || 29,953 || 60–48
|- bgcolor="#fffbbbbbb;"
| 109 || August 5 || @ Rangers || 3–4 || Martinez (7–6) || Kazmir (6–6) || Dyson (2) || 31,782 || 60–49
|- bgcolor="#bbbfffbbb;"
| 110 || August 6 || @ Athletics || 5–4 (10) || Gregerson (5–1) || Mujica (2–4) || Harris (1) || 16,172 || 61–49
|- bgcolor="#fffbbbbbb;"
| 111 || August 7 || @ Athletics || 1–3 || Gray (12–4) || Keuchel (13–6) || — || 18,908 || 61–50
|- bgcolor="#fffbbbbbb;"
| 112 || August 8 || @ Athletics || 1–2 || Chavez (6–11) || McHugh (13–6) || Mujica (1) || 25,091 || 61–51
|- bgcolor="#fffbbbbbb;"
| 113 || August 9 || @ Athletics || 4–5 || Abad (1–2) || Gregerson (5–2) || — || 20,278 || 61–52
|- bgcolor="#fffbbbbbb;"
| 114 || August 11 || @ Giants || 1–3 || Bumgarner (13–6) || Kazmir (6–7) || — || 42,569 || 61–53
|- bgcolor="#bbbfffbbb;"
| 115 || August 12 || @ Giants || 2–0 || Feldman (5–5) || Heston (11–7) || Gregerson (23) || 41,967 || 62–53
|- bgcolor="#bbbfffbbb;"
| 116 || August 14 || Tigers || 5–1 || Keuchel (14–6) || Simón (10–7) || — || 33,212 || 63–53
|- bgcolor="#fffbbbbbb;"
| 117 || August 15 || Tigers || 2–4 (11) || Alburquerque (2–0) || Neshek (3–3) || Feliz (7) || 29,482 || 63–54
|- bgcolor="#bbbfffbbb;"
| 118 || August 16 || Tigers || 6–5 || Harris (5–2) || Gorzelanny (1–2) || — || 29,969 || 64–54
|- bgcolor="#fffbbbbbb;"
| 119 || August 17 || Rays || 2–9 || Ramírez (10–4) || Kazmir (6–8) || — || 16,256 || 64–55
|- bgcolor="#bbbfffbbb;"
| 120 || August 18 || Rays || 3–2 (10) || Gregerson (6–2) || Boxberger (4–9) || — || 17,749 || 65–55
|- bgcolor="#bbbfffbbb;"
| 121 || August 19 || Rays || 3–2 (13) || Fields (4–1) || Andriese (3–3) || — || 26,001 || 66–55
|- bgcolor="#fffbbbbbb;"
| 122 || August 20 || Rays || 0–1 || Archer (11–9) || McHugh (13–7) || — || 18,177 || 66–56
|- bgcolor="#bbbfffbbb;"
| 123 || August 21 || Dodgers || 3–0 || Fiers (6–9) || Anderson (7–9) || — || 33,833 || 67–56
|- bgcolor="#bbbfffbbb;"
| 124 || August 22 || Dodgers || 3–1 || Kazmir (7–8) || Greinke (13–3) || Gregerson (24) || 39,999 || 68–56
|- bgcolor="#bbbfffbbb;"
| 125 || August 23 || Dodgers || 3–2 (10) || Gregerson (7–2) || Hatcher (1–5) || — || 28,665 || 69–56
|- bgcolor="#fffbbbbbb;"
| 126 || August 24 || @ Yankees || 0–1 || Miller (2–2) || Pérez (2–2) || — || 37,125 || 69–57
|- bgcolor="#bbbfffbbb;"
| 127 || August 25 || @ Yankees || 15–1 || Keuchel (15–6) || Nova (5–6) || — || 38,015 || 70–57
|- bgcolor="#bbbfffbbb;"
| 128 || August 26 || @ Yankees || 6–2 || McHugh (14–7) || Pineda (9–8) || — || 37,259 || 71–57
|- bgcolor="#fffbbbbbb;"
| 129 || August 28 || @ Twins || 0–3 || Gibson (9–9) || Kazmir (7–9) || Jepsen (9) || 28,636 || 71–58
|- bgcolor="#bbbfffbbb;"
| 130 || August 29 || @ Twins || 4–1 || Fiers (7–9) || Pelfrey (6–8) || Gregerson (25) || 38,876 || 72–58
|- bgcolor="#fffbbbbbb;"
| 131 || August 30 || @ Twins || 5–7 || Santana (3-4) || McCullers (5–5) || — || 28,877 || 72–59
|- bgcolor="#bbbfffbbb;"
| 132 || August 31 || Mariners || 8–3 || Keuchel (16–6) || Nuño (0–3) || — || 19,923 || 73–59
|-

|- bgcolor="#fffbbbbbb;"
| 133 || September 1 || Mariners || 5–7 || Kensing (1–0) || Neshek (3–4) || Wilhelmsen (7) || 18,157 || 73–60
|- bgcolor="#fffbbbbbb;"
| 134 || September 2 || Mariners || 3–8 || Smith (2–5)  || Neshek (3–5)  || Wilhelmsen (8) || 18,669  || 73–61
|- bgcolor="#bbbfffbbb;"
| 135 || September 4 || Twins || 8–0 || McHugh (15–7) || Pelfrey (6–9) || — || 27,807 || 74–61
|- bgcolor="#fffbbbbbb;"
| 136 || September 5 || Twins || 2–3 || Santana (4–4) || Gregerson (7–3) || Jepsen (11) || 27,643 || 74–62
|- bgcolor="#bbbfffbbb;"
| 137 || September 6 || Twins || 8–5 || Keuchel (17–6) || May (8–9) || Gregerson (26) || 37,648 || 75–62
|- bgcolor="#fffbbbbbb;"
| 138 || September 7 || @ Athletics || 9–10 || Doubront (3–1) || Fiers (7–10) || Doolittle (1) || 22,214 || 75–63
|- bgcolor="#fffbbbbbb;"
| 139 || September 8 || @ Athletics || 0–4 || Gray (13–7) || Kazmir (7–10) || — || 11,364 || 75–64
|- bgcolor="#bbbfffbbb;"
| 140 || September 9 || @ Athletics || 11–5 || McHugh (16–7) || Brooks (1–3) || — || 13,387 || 76–64
|- bgcolor="#fffbbbbbb;"
| 141 || September 11 || @ Angels || 2–3 || Weaver (7–10) || Keuchel (17–7) || Street (34) || 39,636 || 76–65
|- bgcolor="#fffbbbbbb;"
| 142 || September 12 || @ Angels || 2–3 || Smith (5–5) || Harris (5–3) || Street (35) || 41,130 || 76–66
|- bgcolor="#bbbfffbbb;"
| 143 || September 13 || @ Angels || 5–3 || Qualls (2–4) || Street (3–3) || Gregerson (27)  || 41,550 || 77–66
|- bgcolor="#fffbbbbbb;"
| 144 || September 14 || @ Rangers || 3–5 || Kela (7–5)  || Harris (5–4)  || Tolleson (32) || 27,772 || 77–67
|- bgcolor="#fffbbbbbb;"
| 145 || September 15 || @ Rangers || 5–6 || Tolleson (6–3)  || Pérez (2–3)  || — || 26,942 || 77–68
|- bgcolor="#fffbbbbbb;"
| 146 || September 16 || @ Rangers || 3–14 || Pérez (3–4)  || Keuchel (17–8)  || — || 34,483 || 77–69
|- bgcolor="#fffbbbbbb;"
| 147 || September 17 || @ Rangers || 2–8 || Lewis (16–8)  || McCullers (5–6)  || — || 31,122 || 77–70
|- bgcolor="#fffbbbbbb;"
| 148 || September 18 || Athletics || 3–4 || Pomeranz (5–5)  || Neshek (3–6)  || Dull (1) || 27,567 || 77–71
|- bgcolor="#bbbfffbbb;"
| 149 || September 19 || Athletics || 10–6 || Qualls (3–4)  || Rodriguez (4–2)  || — || 27,044 || 78–71
|- bgcolor="#bbbfffbbb;"
| 150 || September 20 || Athletics || 5–1 || McHugh (17–7)  || Brooks (2–4)  || — || 22,453 || 79–71
|- bgcolor="#bbbfffbbb;"
| 151 || September 21 || Angels || 6–3 || Keuchel (18–8)  || Weaver (7–12)  || Gregerson (28) || 25,318 || 80–71
|- bgcolor="#fffbbbbbb;"
| 152 || September 22 || Angels || 3–4 || Santiago (9–9)  || McCullers (5–7)  || Street (39) || 25,671 || 80–72
|- bgcolor="#fffbbbbbb;"
| 153 || September 23 || Angels || 5–6 || Gott (3–2)  || Harris (5–5)  || Street (40) || 25,573 || 80–73
|- bgcolor="#fffbbbbbb;"
| 154 || September 25 || Rangers || 2–6 || Ohlendorf (3–0)  || Kazmir (7–11)  || — || 35,180 || 80–74
|- bgcolor="#bbbfffbbb;"
| 155 || September 26 || Rangers || 9–7 || McHugh (18–7) || Gonzalez (4–6) || Harris (2) || 35,736 || 81–74
|- bgcolor="#bbbfffbbb;"
| 156 || September 27 || Rangers || 4–2 || Keuchel (19–8) || Pérez (3–6) || Gregerson (29) || 36,084 || 82–74
|- bgcolor="#bbbfffbbb;"
| 157 || September 28 || @ Mariners || 3–2 || McCullers (6–7) || Farquhar (1–6) || Gregerson (30) || 13,935 || 83–74
|- bgcolor="#fffbbbbbb;"
| 158 || September 29 || @ Mariners || 4–6 || Wilhelmsen (2–2) || Pérez (2–4) || — || 15,331 || 83–75
|- bgcolor="#bbbfffbbb;"
| 159 || September 30 || @ Mariners || 7–6 || Sipp (3–4) || Farquhar (1–7) || Gregerson (31) || 14,257 || 84–75
|-

|- bgcolor="#bbbfffbbb;"
| 160 || October 2 || @ D-backs || 21–5 || Keuchel (20–8)  ||De La Rosa (14–9) || — || 33,218  || 85–75
|- bgcolor="#bbbfffbbb;"
| 161 || October 3 || @ D-backs || 6–2 || McHugh (19–7) || Hellickson (9–12) || — || 37,687 || 86–75
|- bgcolor="#fffbbbbbb;"
| 162 || October 4 || @ D-backs || 3–5 || Hudson (4–3) || Qualls (3–5) || Ziegler (30) || 24,788 || 86–76
|-

|-
| Legend:       = Win       = Loss       = PostponementBold = Astros team member

Postseason

|- align="center" bgcolor="bbbfffbbb"
| 1 || October 6 || @ Yankees || 3–0 || Keuchel (1–0)  ||  Tanaka  (0–1)  || Gregerson (1)  || 50,113 ||1–0
|-

|- text-align:center; bgcolor="bbbfffbbb"
| 1 || October 8 || @ Royals || 5–2 || McHugh (1–0) || Ventura (0–1) || Gregerson (1) || 40,146 || 1–0
|- text-align:center; bgcolor="fffbbbbbb"
| 2 || October 9 ||  @ Royals || 4–5 || Herrera (1–0)  || Harris (0–1) || Davis (1)  || 40,008 || 1–1
|- text-align:center; bgcolor="bbbfffbbb"
| 3 || October 11 || Royals|| 4–2 || Keuchel (1–0) || Vólquez (0–1) || Gregerson (2) || 42,674 || 2–1
|- text-align:center; bgcolor="fffbbbbbb"
| 4 || October 12 || Royals || 6–9 || Madson (1–0) || Sipp (0–1) || Davis (2) || 42,387 || 2–2
|- text-align:center; bgcolor="fffbbbbbb"
| 5 || October 14 || @ Royals || 2–7 || Cueto (1–0) || McHugh (1–1) || – || 40,566 || 2–3
|-

Postseason rosters

| style="text-align:left" |
Pitchers: 29 Tony Sipp 35 Josh Fields 36 Will Harris 37 Pat Neshek 38 Óliver Pérez 44 Luke Gregerson 50 Chad Qualls 54 Mike Fiers 60 Dallas Keuchel 
Catchers: 15 Jason Castro 16 Hank Conger 
Infielders: 1 Carlos Correa 2 Jonathan Villar 8 Jed Lowrie 9 Marwin González 18 Luis Valbuena 23 Chris Carter 27 José Altuve 63 Matt Duffy 
Outfielders: 4 George Springer 6 Jake Marisnick 20 Preston Tucker 28 Colby Rasmus 30 Carlos Gómez 
Designated hitters: 11 Evan Gattis
|- valign="top"

| style="text-align:left" |
Pitchers: 26 Scott Kazmir 29 Tony Sipp 31 Collin McHugh 35 Josh Fields 36 Will Harris 37 Pat Neshek 38 Óliver Pérez 43 Lance McCullers Jr. 44 Luke Gregerson 54 Mike Fiers 60 Dallas Keuchel 
Catchers: 15 Jason Castro 16 Hank Conger 
Infielders: 1 Carlos Correa 8 Jed Lowrie 9 Marwin González 18 Luis Valbuena 23 Chris Carter 27 José Altuve  
Outfielders: 4 George Springer 6 Jake Marisnick 20 Preston Tucker 28 Colby Rasmus 30 Carlos Gómez 
Designated hitters: 11 Evan Gattis
|- valign="top"

Roster

Statistics
Through 2015 season

Batting
Note: G = Games played; AB = At bats; R = Runs scored; H = Hits; 2B = Doubles; 3B = Triples; HR = Home runs; RBI = Runs batted in; BB = Base on balls; SO = Strikeouts; AVG = Batting average; SB = Stolen bases

Pitching
Note: W = Wins; L = Losses; ERA = Earned run average; G = Games pitched; GS = Games started; SV = Saves; IP = Innings pitched; H = Hits allowed; R = Runs allowed; ER = Earned runs allowed; HR = Home runs allowed; BB = Walks allowed; K = Strikeouts

Farm system

LEAGUE CHAMPIONS: Fresno, Greeneville

References

External links

2015 Houston Astros season official site 
2015 Houston Astros season at Baseball Reference

Houston Astros seasons
Houston Astros
2015 in sports in Texas